Randy Louis Lerch (born October 9, 1954), is an American former professional baseball pitcher, who played in Major League Baseball (MLB) for the Philadelphia Phillies, Milwaukee Brewers, Montreal Expos, and San Francisco Giants, from  to .

Early life 

Lerch was born in Sacramento, California and attended Cordova High School in Rancho Cordova, California.

Baseball career 

Lerch was drafted by the Philadelphia Phillies in 1973 and debuted in the major leagues with the Phillies in September 1975.  His first full season was 1977, and he was a mainstay in the Phillies' pitching rotation from 1977 until 1980, when he began pitching more in relief.

On September 30, 1978, Lerch hit two home runs in a 10–8 win that clinched the National League (NL) East Division championship for the Phillies.

Lerch was part of the Phillies' 1980 World Series-winning team, although he led the league in losses that season with 14 and never appeared in the World Series.  During the season, Lerch fell out of favor with the team's manager, Dallas Green, and voiced an interest in being traded.  As a result, Lerch was left off the Phillies' 1980 postseason roster.

Not long after the Phillies won the 1980 World Series, it was enmeshed in a scandal involving amphetamines that had been taken by several members of the team.  In 1981, Lerch testified under oath that the Phillies' team physician for its Double-A affiliate in Reading, Pennsylvania had prescribed amphetamines for the organization's major league players, and that Lerch himself had received the pills.

Soon after testifying, Lerch was traded by the Phillies to the Milwaukee Brewers on March 1, 1981 for outfielder Dick Davis.

In August 1982, the Brewers sold Lerch to the Montreal Expos, who released Lerch in July 1983.  He then was signed by the San Francisco Giants less than two weeks later.  After the 1984 season, Lerch filed for free agency and was signed the following year by the Phillies.  He pitched about a year for the Phillies before they released him in June 1986.

Lerch's career win–loss record was 60–64, with 507 strikeouts and a 4.53 earned run average (ERA).

Lerch was a better than average hitting pitcher, posting a .206 batting average (55-for-267) with 27 runs, 4 home runs, 23 RBI and 19 bases on balls.  Defensively, he was better than average, recording a .966 fielding percentage which was 13 points higher than the league average at his position.

Lerch was inducted into the Reading Baseball Hall of Fame in Reading, Pennsylvania in 2000.

Memoir 

In 2019, Lerch published his 256-page autobiography, "God in the Bullpen," written with retired professional engineer Harold "Hal" Lerch, who despite their shared surname is no relation.  The book discusses Randy Lerch's battles with drug and alcohol addiction. Columnist Barry M. Bloom called it "perhaps the greatest tell-all baseball book since the late Jim Bouton wrote Ball Four in 1970."

Personal life 

Lerch lives in Shingle Springs, California.  He was diagnosed with cirrhosis in 2016, which was caused by alcohol addiction.

References

External links

1954 births
Living people
American expatriate baseball players in Canada
Auburn Phillies players
Baseball players from Sacramento, California
Louisville Redbirds players
Major League Baseball pitchers
Milwaukee Brewers players
Montreal Expos players
Oklahoma City 89ers players
Philadelphia Phillies players
Phoenix Giants players
Portland Beavers players
Reading Phillies players
Rocky Mount Phillies players
San Francisco Giants players
St. Petersburg Pelicans players